Carrott's Lib is a British satirical comedy series broadcast between 2 October 1982 and 30 December 1983. It starred Jasper Carrott and a cast of many comedians. The show was a satirical comedy and sketch show, featuring many comedians who went on to become famous in their own right, notably Chris Barrie (Red Dwarf, The Brittas Empire) and Jan Ravens (Dead Ringers, Spitting Image).  It was broadcast live from Shepherd's Bush on Saturday nights, albeit with some pre-recorded elements.

Transmissions
 Series 1: seven episodes, broadcast 2 October 1982 to 13 November 1982
 Election special: broadcast 9 June 1983
 Series 2: eight episodes, broadcast 22 October 1983 to 10 December 1983
 Christmas special: broadcast 30 December 1983

External links

1980s British satirical television series
1982 British television series debuts
1983 British television series endings
BBC television comedy
BBC television sketch shows